Stenoma crambina is a moth in the family Depressariidae. It was described by August Busck in 1920. It is found in Mexico.

The wingspan is 25–33 mm. The forewings are stone white with a brownish tint suffused on the dorsal third and along the veins with dark fuscous. There is a black dot at the end of the cell and a series of very indistinct marginal dark fuscous dots along the terminal edge. The hindwings are very pale yellowish fuscous (nearly white), somewhat darker toward the apex and with a thin brownish line in the white cilia.

References

Moths described in 1920
Stenoma